The 2008–09 season was Swindon Town's second season in the League One since their relegation from the division in 2006. Alongside the league campaign, Swindon Town will also competed in the FA Cup, League Cup and the Football League Trophy.

Football League One

Leicester comfortably won promotion in their first-ever season at this level, leading the table for virtually the entire season, going half the season (23 consecutive games) unbeaten and losing just 4 games in the process, Nigel Pearson brought stability to the club in becoming their first manager in five years to last an entire season as they looked to turn the corner after several years of struggle. Peterborough were runners-up, winning their second successive promotion and entering the second tier for only the second time in their history. Scunthorpe grabbed the final play-off place on the last day of the season in a winner takes all match v 7th place Tranmere Rovers and won promotion through them, making an immediate return to the Championship after being relegated the previous year.

Stockport went into administration before the final match of the season and so suffered a 10-point penalty; however, there was no real chance of them being relegated as a result of this penalty, barring an extremely unlikely set of results on the final day.

Hereford made an immediate return to League Two, finishing bottom in their first campaign at this level for thirty years. Cheltenham improved late in the season, but it proved too late to prevent relegation. Crewe suffered a late collapse and went down to League Two, having looked safe a few weeks previously, while Northampton were undone by other results going against them on the final day of the season.

Table

Results

Legend

League One

FA Cup

League Cup

Football League Trophy

References

Swindon Town F.C. seasons
Swindon Town F.C.